Softball was contested by five teams in a round robin competition at the 1990 Asian Games in Beijing, China from September 23 to September 28, 1990.

China won the gold medal in a round robin competition.

Medalists

Results

Final standing

References
 Results

External links
 Olympic council of Asia

 
1990 Asian Games events
1990
Asian Games